Dennis "Joseph" Gile (born February 17, 1981) is a former American football quarterback who broke training camp with the New England Patriots in 2004, and who played two seasons with the Saskatchewan Roughriders of the Canadian Football League (CFL). He played college football at Central Missouri State University. Gile also played indoor football or arena football for the Green Bay Blizzard, Arizona Rattlers, Utah Blaze, Bakersfield Blitz, Odessa Roughnecks and Kansas City Renegades. Based in Scottsdale, Arizona, he is considered one of the nation's top private quarterback coaches and runs his own training academy; while focusing on upper body bio mechanics.

Early years
Dennis is a native of Arizona where he was a First Team All-Arizona quarterback for Cortez High School in Phoenix, Arizona.

College career
Gile was a two-year starter for the Central Missouri Mules from 2001 to 2002 and compiled outstanding numbers for the Mules program. During those two seasons, Gile recorded career totals of 4,741 passing yards and 40 touchdowns. He also rushed for 285 yards and three touchdowns. He was a First Team All-Conference quarterback. He broke the national passing efficiency record with a rating of 214.0. He led Central Missouri State to their best combined record in the program’s history at 20-4.

Professional career
Dennis Gile broke training camp with the New England Patriots in 2003, and played in the Canadian Football League for the next two seasons.

Gile played for the Green Bay Blizzard of the af2 in 2004. Gile was released by the Blizzard on May 6, 2004. He played for the CFL's Saskatchewan Roughriders from 2004 to 2005. He signed with the Arizona Rattlers of the Arena Football League (AFL) on January 9, 2006. He was signed by the AFL's Utah Blaze on April 5, 2006. Gile was released by the Blaze on April 10, 2006. He played for the Bakersfield Blitz of the af2 in 2007. He played for the Odessa Roughnecks from 2008 to 2009. He threw for 2,027 yards and 41 touchdowns while also recording six rushing touchdowns in 2008. He also led the Roughnecks to a 7-7 regular season record and a playoff victory over the Frisco Thunder. Gile was named to the 2008 IFL All-Star Team. He played for the Kansas City Renegades in 2013.

Dennis Gile Quarterback Academy
In 2007, Gile established the "Dennis Gile Quarterback Academy" which is based out of Scottsdale, Arizona.

Gile has trained Ryan Kelley, a four-start quarterback recruit, for years in Arizona. Kelley is currently committed to the Arizona State University. The Dennis Gile Quarterback Academy has worked with Kyle Allen, Blake Barnett, and Luke Rubenzer. Gile has also worked with pros such as Colin Kaepernick, Tyrod, Taylor, Tom Brady, Tim Tebow, Brett Hundley, Christian Ponder and Tyrod Taylor. He also helped to get offers for Kyle Allen from Texas A&M University.

In 2015, Gile worked with San Francisco 49ers quarterback Colin Kaepernick for a ten-week offseason session in Arizona. Kaepernick spent five days a week, beginning January 12, working out, watching film and fine-tuning his mechanics. This was the first time in his NFL career where he sought the assistance of independent coaches during the NFL offseason. Every weekday for 10 weeks, he conditioned and lifted weights at the EXOS training facility in Phoenix from 8 to 10:30 a.m. Then, he would spend time in the film room, work on his mechanics and throw passes until 1 p.m. He worked with 49ers wide receivers Quinton Patton and Bruce Ellington, as well as players from other NFL teams, including Odell Beckham Jr. and Jarvis Landry, Ricardo Lockette and Darrius Heyward-Bey. Top 2015 draft prospects Kevin White, Dorial Green-Beckham and Jaelen Strong also regularly attended the workouts. Gile also worked with former Super Bowl champion, Kurt Warner, while working with Kaepernick.

Gile also spent time fine tuning Buffalo Bills quarterback Tyrod Taylor during the NFL offseason.

2016 season 
During the 2016 spring break QB training session in Scottsdale, Arizona; Notre Dame quarterback Malik Zaire, who previously trained with Gile, will likely be joined by Deondre Francois (Florida State University), Brandon Harris (LSU) and Manny Wilkins (Arizona State University). When Malik Zaire threw in January 2016, he did it with Kyle Allen (University of Houston), Darrell Garretson (Oregon State University) and Connor Brewer (University of Virginia) while training with receivers Christian Kirk (Texas A&M University), Speedy Noil (Texas A&M University) and Emmanuel Butler (Northern Arizona University). For Zaire, the January 2016 winter session ran a week-plus with sessions going about six hours a day. A typical day started with throwing sessions, followed by lifting or speed work. Gile performed quarterback drill mechanics, repeating the throwing motion with Zaire’s upper body while making sure he got proper drive with his lower body. They also worked on mobility within the pocket, making sure Zaire didn’t close his stance or lose balance while moving laterally. "You want to make it as close as you can to Tom Brady because he’s the best in the world," Gile said. "Good footwork works in every offensive scheme. I just try to make their feet as good as possible." After breaking for lunch, Zaire locked into an Axon Sports virtual reality simulator that is based in one of Gile's facility. No other private quarterback coach has this Axon Sports simulator other than the Dennis Gile Quarterback Academy. "We could see everything from the quarterback’s viewpoint, what the defense is doing, blitzes, coverage adjustments pre-snap, post-snap, all on a 70-inch screen," Gile said. "Then we’d go over film and talk about the game from a graduate level standpoint." Gile believed Zaire was 75-to-80 percent healthy during the winter workouts. For Dennis Gile, who also trained one-time Notre Dame verbal commitment Blake Barnett (Alabama), there’s already a favorite in the next Irish quarterback competition.

"Zaire stayed at his father's home during winter break after Notre Dame's Fiesta Bowl loss to Ohio State and worked out with Gile".

"Gile had two sessions with Bush when he talked to The World-Herald. He'd work Bush through some chalkboard/classroom sessions Tuesday night, but Bush told him that he'd done well on playbook quizzes at Nebraska. Bush is throwing alongside a number of starting Division I quarterbacks – including Notre Dame's Malik Zaire, Texas A&M's Trevor Knight, Houston's Kyle Allen and UCLA's Josh Rosen – and doing well.

"He might have thrown the best post patterns out of anyone," said Gile, who was contacted by Bush's dad to work with the Atlanta native. "He figured out a few things. He threw some balls today that would have blown some people's mind. He didn't start out that way, but he was getting it. The biggest thing is how coachable a kid he is." Bush 

"Gile works with the Arizona State University football quarterbacks during their school breaks in Scottsdale Arizona.  College trainings are five days long and is very intense as Gile usually has 7 other elite college quarterbacks compete with one another and train with one another. Early in 2016 fall camp Bryce Perkins (ASU) showed off an improved throwing mechanic, which he told SunDevilSource.com was the result of working with local Arizona quarterback coach Dennis Gile during the summer."

"Bush went to work with private quarterbacks coach Dennis Gile over the summer. The talent level is there – his ceiling is super high," said Gile, who played college football and spent two years in the Canadian Football League. "I’m not trying to create somebody who’s not a quarterback. I’m just trying to help someone be a better quarterback. No question, he’s a Division I starting quarterback at a high, high level. It’s everything. He has all the intangibles to play the position."

"Zaire stated that he will stay in Arizona to train with Dennis Gile, a quarterback guru of sorts who runs ‘The Quarterback Academy’ in Arizona. Zaire will look to sharpen his skills with Gile who has worked with a ton of high-profile talent including stars like Tom Brady and Tyrod Taylor. Gile is known for working his notable collegiate talent as well as he has worked with Zaire in the past, as well as guys like Kyle Allen of Houston and Deandre Francois of Florida State."

2017 season 
"The 6-foot-4, 225-pound Bush, who has been working out at the Dennis Gile Quarterback Academy in Arizona, originally signed with Nebraska in 2014, spending two seasons on the bench before leaving for the junior college ranks at Iowa Western in Council Bluffs, Iowa, this August. He was battling for the third-team quarterback job at the time."

Momentous has executed a talent agreement with Dennis Gile, coach at the Dennis Gile Quarterback Academy, to possibly appear in Momentous' upcoming reality TV series, tentatively titled Chasing a Legend: The Racing Life of Bobby Earnhardt, as well as to star in his own, to-be-determined reality TV series. Gile has worked as a quarterback coach following his playing career. Mr. Gile is a former American football quarterback who played two seasons in the Canadian Football League and was also a member of the New England Patriots, Green Bay Blizzard, Arizona Rattlers, Utah Blaze and Odessa Roughnecks. Additionally, he played at the collegiate level at Central Missouri State University. He also races sprint cars in the USAC Southwest Sprint Cars championships. We will also look at the potential for a sports-related series revolving around Dennis' quarterback school in Scottsdale, Arizona, possibly including major professional football quarterbacks, or a show focusing on his auto racing activities.

"One similarity with his high school recruiting is knowing that other quarterbacks are also being considered by some of these schools. Former Notre Dame starter Malik Zaire is in a similar predicament as a grad transfer looking for a new home. "We’re really good friends," Harris said. "I may end up working out with him in the beginning of April (in Arizona with private quarterbacks coach Dennis Gile)."

"An opportunity. That’s what Malik Zaire calls the five-month gap between his graduation from Notre Dame last December and an arrival at the next stop in his college career in June – wherever that may be. An opportunity to train in Scottsdale, Ariz., with quarterbacks coach Dennis Gile. An opportunity to spend more time with his father, Imani Zaire, who lives in Arizona. An opportunity to recharge, reconsider and redirect his future. "It’s just an opportunity to really rebuild and hammer down on the techniques and just be a quarterback in general," said Zaire, who also worked with Gile – a former quarterback at Central Missouri State and in the CFL – following Notre Dame’s Fiesta Bowl loss in January 2016.

"Playing at the next level is something Hefley is preparing for putting in overtime with his coaches and teammates at Bryant and working when possible with national quarterback guru Dennis Giles in Arizona."

"Bush has also continued to work with quarterback coach Dennis Gile, who broke training camp with the New England Patriots in 2003, and played in the Canadian Football League for the next two seasons. Bush first trained with Gile while at Nebraska, and has stuck with him since."

"A former Nebraska quarterback who is a dual-threat option. Fuente also followed Dennis Gile QB Academy, where Bush is currently working out.)" 

"Bush, who first worked with Gile after his sophomore year, went back to Arizona to train with the quarterback coach following the season. Texas A&M showed some interest but didn’t have a scholarship available until the fall. Then Virginia Tech came calling, with an intriguing opportunity... Gile, who has worked with a long line of quarterbacks, including crossing paths with former Tech QB Tyrod Taylor in the offseason after Taylor signed with the Buffalo Bills, thinks the Hokies are a good fit for Bush... The pursuit led him to make calls to Arizona and private quarterback coach Dennis Gile, who’d worked with just that kind of player in Bush.

"Super infectious," Gile said. "Just a smiling, happy-go-lucky type kid. Never been down by any situation whenever I’ve been around him. Not one time. Never."

"He spent last May working out in Arizona with quarterback coach Dennis Gile, training alongside Notre Dame’s Malik Zaire, Texas A&M’s Trevor Knight, Houston’s Kyle Allen and UCLA’s Josh Rosen."

"Instead of going home during spring break, Cal Quarterback Ross Bowers spent the week in Scottsdale, Arizona., training with Dennis Gile at the Quarterback Academy. Each day included a throwing practice, a weightlifting session and a surprise workout – something like yoga or boxing."

"The athletic left-hander told this news organization in March he is spending this semester working out at the Dennis Gile Quarterback Academy in Arizona and wants to finish his career somewhere that could still help him get to the NFL. " 

"After moving in with his father in Arizona back in late December, upon completing his classes at Notre Dame, Zaire has been working with professional quarterback coach Dennis Gile to improve his footwork and mechanics."

"Zaire's father lives in Arizona and quarterback trainer Dennis Gile works out of Scottsdale, Arizona, so that felt like a natural fit for Zaire to train and begin to be recruited anew. He started working with Gile after his departure from Notre Dame to improve and be a team's unquestioned starter."

Dennis Gile speaks about his football career to how he became a quarterback coach and more specifically about Deondre Franois (Florida State University) 

Allen began working with quarterback guru Dennis Gile early in high school, and the two remain close "like brothers," often chatting on FaceTime three to four times a week.  At their first workout, Gile noticed flaws in Allen's mechanics, but that did not stop him from making a bold prediction.  "You're going to be the best quarterback in the country," said Gile, who has worked with such star quarterbacks as Tom Brady, Drew Brees, Colin Kaepernick and Cam Newton. "His dad and him looked at me like I was crazy."  As Allen went to camps and had success he began to get noticed by nearly every major program in the country.  "Things took off fast," Gile said.

""It’s awesome to watch Manny Wilkins battle through what he has experienced in life and transition that to the field. Manny and I train together with our QB coach Dennis Gile. Not many times do you get to watch your former teammates become hometown heroes like Chase and N'Keal."

Signing Day Sports
Dennis Gile is the founder of Signing Day Sports. Through his quarterback academy, he noticed the sheer amount of student athletes going unnoticed by college coaches. So, he decided to use his connections and expertise to create Signing Day Sports.

Signing Day Sports’ student athlete driven platform fills the void in the current online recruiting landscape between fan-driven recruiting sites and highlight reel recruiting platforms. The platform is designed to connect college coaches more efficiently with high school student athletes whom they might not have been aware of otherwise. The platform includes verified athletic metrics, side-by-side video comparison capability, and in-platform messaging.

Personal life
Gile races sprint cars in the USAC Southwest Sprint Cars championships.

In 2006, Dennis worked for the Phoenix Police Department in Arizona. After completing the academy, he left the department during field training.

He was also featured on an episode of Baseball Wives, where he met with ex spouses of baseball players in Scottsdale.  

In November 2015, Momentous Entertainment Group signed a talent agreement with Gile to appear in two reality TV series made by Momentous. He will appear in a Bobby Earnhardt TV series tentatively titled Chasing a Legend: The Racing Life of Bobby Earnhardt, and star in his own reality series.

In April 2016, Momentous Entertainment Group began filming for its reality TV series "The Quarterback Academy".

References

External links
 
 
 
 Dennis Gile at Just Sports Stats
 QBacademy.com – The Dennis Gile Quarterback Academy

Living people
1981 births
American football quarterbacks
Canadian football quarterbacks
American players of Canadian football
Central Missouri Mules football players
Green Bay Blizzard players
Saskatchewan Roughriders players
Arizona Rattlers players
Utah Blaze players
Bakersfield Blitz players
Odessa Roughnecks players
Kansas City Renegades players
Players of American football from Phoenix, Arizona
Sportspeople from Phoenix, Arizona